Moulton is a village and civil parish in the West Suffolk district of Suffolk in eastern England, located close to the town of Newmarket. It pre-dates the 1086 Domesday book and, in 2005, it was estimated to have a population of 1090. 1,033 people were recorded at the 2011 census.

The village is older than the now larger town of Newmarket and includes a 15th-century packhorse bridge spanning the River Kennett. The bridge is a grade II* listed structure 

Moulton also has a fine church, St. Peter's, with an early 14th-century tower topped by a gilded weather vane in the shape of a large pike by blacksmith Charles Poulter. Restored in 1851, it is a grade I listed building.

John Gower connection
In August 1382 John Gower purchased the manors of Feltwell in Norfolk and Multon in Suffolk. They were then granted to Thomas Blakelake, parson of St. Nicholas, Feltwell, and others, at a rent of forty pounds annually for his life.

Notable residents

People
Mike Dillon
William Cowie

Horses
Alborada
With Approval

References

External links

Moulton Village Website
 History Moulton Packhorse Bridge: English Heritage

Villages in Suffolk
Forest Heath
Civil parishes in Suffolk